Ezzahra Sports, or EZS, is a Tunisian professional basketball club from Ezzahra.  The club competes in the Championnat National A, the domestic first tier. Home games are played in the Ezzahra Arena.

History

Ezzahra has won the Tunisian League championship 6 times, in the years 1982, 1983, 1993, 1994, 1997, and 1999. They have also won the Tunisian Cup 5 times, in the years 1985, 1988, 1991, 1995, and 1998.

Honours

Domestic competitions
Tunisian Basketball League
Champions (6): 1979, 1982, 1983, 1993, 1994, 1997, 1999
Runners-up (2): 2021, 2022
Tunisian Cup
Champions (5): 1985, 1988, 1991, 1995, 1998
Tunisian Federation Cup
Champions (1): 2020
Tunisian Division II Cup
Champions (1): 2020

International competititons
Arab Championship
Third place (3): 1993, 1997, 2021

Players

Current roster
The following is the current Ezzahra Sports roster:

References

Notes

External links
AfricaBasket.com Team Page
Official Facebook page

Basketball teams in Tunisia
Basketball teams established in 1936